Navin Prabhakar is an Indian comedian, singer, actor and a mimicry artist. He is most known for his Pehchan Kaun (Mumbai bar girl) act on The Great Indian Laughter Challenge (2005). Subsequently, he hosted a mimicry and stand-up show Hello Kaun? Pehchaan Kaun (2008–2009).

Career
Navin, a commerce graduate from Mumbai University, began his career as a singer, then actor, then began experimenting with making people laugh. After getting a good response in comedy deliveries, Navin decided to test himself at a national platform through the famous comedy show The Great Indian Laughter Challenge in 2005 which quickly made a name for himself with his trade-mark expression "Paichan Kon" of "Julie – the bar girl". After this, he worked on new ventures as a singer, actor, host, stand-up and mimicry artist. Gujarati corporate comedians. He started trend as working as a corporate comedian. His shows include 2hrs live laughter, where he does his trademark "Paichan Kon" act. He is regarded as one of the top Indian corporate comedians. 

Prabhakar has given voiceover in films including Mohabbat Ho Gayi Hai Tumse, Maine Dil Tujhko Diya, Nehle Pe Dehla, Champion and Ara Ara Aaba, Aata Tari Thamba. He did the voiceover for the song "Dhagala lagli kala". He has also sung in Adnan Sami's song "Lift Karade" (Remix) as a voiceover artist. Albums that were further released were Chor Chor, Spicy Mango, Jalwa Part II, Saangu and Naka.

Filmography
Films

Television

References

External links
 Navin Prabhakar Official Website
 

Living people
Indian stand-up comedians
Indian television presenters
Indian male voice actors
Male actors in Hindi cinema
21st-century Indian male actors
Place of birth missing (living people)
Year of birth missing (living people)
Indian male comedians